Chile competed at the 2004 Summer Olympics in Athens, Greece, from 13 to 29 August 2004. 

Chilean Olympic Committee (COCH) sent a total of 22 athletes to the Games, 16 men and 6 women, to compete in 11 sports; the nation's team size was roughly smaller from Sydney by almost half of the athletes, due to the absence of the men's football team. Six Chilean athletes had previously competed in Sydney, including tennis star and top medal favorite Nicolás Massú. Long-distance freestyle swimmer and Pan American Games bronze medalist Kristel Köbrich set a historic milestone as the nation's first ever female flag bearer in the opening ceremony, wearing and parading with a traditional Chilean costume.

Chile left Athens with a remarkable historic milestone from tennis players Nicolás Massú and Fernando González, as they picked up the grand slam Olympic title for the Chilean team in the men's doubles tournament. While Gonzalez collected a bronze in his match against U.S. tennis player Taylor Dent, Massu summoned his strength to defeat Dent's teammate Mardy Fish with a striking effort to complete the Chilean party on the Olympic tennis court, and most significantly, to snatch his second gold medal in the men's singles.

Medalists

Athletics

Chilean athletes have so far achieved qualifying standards in the following athletics events (up to a maximum of 3 athletes in each event at the 'A' Standard, and 1 at the 'B' Standard).

Men
Field events

Women
Track & road events

Field events

Canoeing

Sprint

Qualification Legend: Q = Qualify to final; q = Qualify to semifinal

Cycling

Road

Track
Omnium

Mountain biking

Fencing

Chile has qualified a single fencer.

Men

Judo

Chile has qualified a single judoka.

Rowing

Chilean rowers qualified the following boats:

Men

Women

Qualification Legend: FA=Final A (medal); FB=Final B (non-medal); FC=Final C (non-medal); FD=Final D (non-medal); FE=Final E (non-medal); FF=Final F (non-medal); SA/B=Semifinals A/B; SC/D=Semifinals C/D; SE/F=Semifinals E/F; R=Repechage

Sailing

Chilean sailors have qualified one boat for each of the following events.

Open

M = Medal race; OCS = On course side of the starting line; DSQ = Disqualified; DNF = Did not finish; DNS= Did not start; RDG = Redress given

Shooting 

Chile has qualified a single shooter.

Men

Swimming 

Chilean swimmers earned qualifying standards in the following events (up to a maximum of 2 swimmers in each event at the A-standard time, and 1 at the B-standard time):

Men

Women

Table tennis

Four Chilean table tennis players qualified for the following events.

Tennis

Chile nominated two male tennis players to compete in the tournament.

See also
 Chile at the 2003 Pan American Games
 Chile at the 2004 Summer Paralympics

References

External links
Official Report of the XXVIII Olympiad
Chilean Olympic Committee 

Nations at the 2004 Summer Olympics
2004
Summer Olympics